The Bone & Joint Journal, formerly known as The Journal of Bone & Joint Surgery (British Volume), is a monthly peer-reviewed medical journal published by The British Editorial Society of Bone & Joint Surgery. It is the flagship journal within the society's 'Bone & Joint Publishing' imprint, which also includes Bone & Joint Research, Bone & Joint 360, EFORT Open Reviews (published in partnership with the European Federation of National Associations of Orthopaedics and Traumatology) and the Journal of Children's Orthopaedics (published on behalf of the European Paediatric Orthopaedic Society).

The journal is the official publication of the British Orthopaedic Association, Canadian Orthopaedic Association, New Zealand Orthopaedic Association and Australian Orthopaedic Association.

Abstracting and indexing
The journal is indexed in MEDLINE. According to the Journal Citation Reports, it has a 2019 Impact Factor of 4.306.

References

External links

English-language journals
Monthly journals
Orthopedics journals
Publications established in 1948